Russophilia (literally love of Russia or Russians) is admiration and fondness of Russia (including the era of the Soviet Union and/or the Russian Empire), Russian history and Russian culture. The antonym is Russophobia. In the 19th Century, Russophilia was often linked to variants of Pan-Slavism, since the Russian Empire and the autonomous Serbia were the only two slav-associated sovereign states during and after Spring of Nations.

Russophilia in Europe 
American author Robert Alexander wrote: "I love Russians for their dramatic, emotional nature. They're not afraid to love, not afraid to get hurt, not afraid to exaggerate or act impulsively."

Russophilia in Serbia 
Russia is hugely popular in Serbia, and Serbs have always traditionally seen Russia as a close ally due to shared Slavic heritage, culture, and Orthodox faith. According to European Council on Foreign Relations, 54% of Serbians see Russia as an ally. In comparison, 11% see European Union as an ally, and only 6% see United States in the same manner. During the 2022 Russian invasion of Ukraine, People's Patrol, a far-right group, organized pro-Russian rallies in Belgrade, which were attended by 4,000 people.

The Serbian village of Putinovo's inhabitants renamed their village in honor of Vladimir Putin. In Belgrade, there are the Russian Center of Science and Culture and the Hotel Moskva.

Russophilia in Montenegro 
Montenegro is also an Eastern Orthodox and Slavic country. There is the Moscow Bridge in Podgorica, and a statue of Russian singer and actor Vladimir Vysotsky next to the bridge. During the 2022 Russian invasion of Ukraine, a pro-Russian rally was held in Nikšić.

Russophilia in Ukraine 

Following Ukrainian independence in 1991 Ukrainians, mostly in the east and south of the country, voted to a see a more Russophile attitude of the government, ranging from closer economic partnership to full national union. Russia and Ukraine enjoyed especially close economic ties, while the Russophilic political party, the Party of Regions, became the largest party in the Verkhovna Rada in 2006. It would remain a dominant force in Ukrainian politics, until the 2014 Revolution of Dignity. Following the 2014 Russian military intervention in Ukraine, the overall attitude of Ukrainians towards Russia and Russians has become much more negative, with most Ukrainians favoring NATO and European Union membership.

41% of Ukrainians had a "good" attitude towards Russians (42% negatively), while in general 54% of Russians had a positive attitude towards Ukraine, according to an October 2021 of the country's population. As of 2021, there were several parties in Ukraine considered Russophile including the Opposition Platform — For Life, the Opposition Bloc, Our Land, Nashi and the Party of Shariy.

Russophilia in Finland 
The Communism movement in Finland during the Cold War inclined towards pro-Soviet tendencies, of these the Taistoist movement was especially pro-Soviet. 

The Finnish political party "Power Belongs To The People" is unique from other parties by their strong support of Russia, being the only pro-Russian party in Finland as of 2022. They protested against sanctions to Russia and supported the 2022 invasion of Ukraine.  The Finnish political activist "Johan Bäckman" is known for pro-Russian views and has recruited Finns to fight for Russia in the war with Ukraine. Bäckman later joined the party "Power Belongs to the People" lead by Ano Turtiainen. However, a few members of the Finns Party have had pro-Russian views.

In 2022 Finnish Russians held a pro-Russian protest in Helsinki.

Russophilia in Asia

Russophilia in Vietnam 
Favorable perceptions of Russia in Vietnam have 83% of Vietnamese people viewing Russia's influence positively in 2017. This stems from the former Soviet Union support of Vietnam during the Vietnam War.

Russophilia in Iran 
According to a December 2018 survey by IranPoll, 63.8% of Iranians have a favorable view of Russia.

Russophilia in Indonesia 
Support for Russia remains high among Indonesians as they found animosity towards the West and support for Russia owing to Moscow's perceived ties with Muslims and the Islamic world. The US and its allies also invaded Afghanistan and Iraq, and neglected Palestinians suffering under occupying Israeli forces.

Even this movement that compare Indonesian to support Vladimir Putin to fight against Ukraine to supporting Suharto for fight against East Timor during invasion in 1975.

Russophilia in Africa

Pro-Russian protests during the 2022 Russian invasion of Ukraine 
In response to the 2022 Russian invasion of Ukraine and pro-Ukrainian, anti-war protests around the world, many pro-Russian counter-protests were held. Such protests were held in several countries, including Australia, Burkina Faso, the Central African Republic, the Czech Republic, Germany, Moldova, Palestine, Serbia and the United Kingdom.

See also 

 All-Russian nation
 Eurasian Economic Union
 Eurasianism
 Euroscepticism
 Nostalgia for the Soviet Union
 Putinism
 Russian avos'
 Russian nationalism
 Russification
 Slavophilia
 Union State

References 

 Orest Subtelny. Ukraine. A history. University of Toronto Press. 1994. .

External links 

 
Russian culture
Foreign relations of Russia
Admiration of foreign cultures